The Qarabağ 2014–15 season was Qarabağ's 22nd Azerbaijan Premier League season and their seventh season under manager Gurban Gurbanov. They completed a domestic double by defending their Premier League title and winning the Azerbaijan Cup. In Europe, Qarabağ were knocked out of the UEFA Champions League in the 3rd qualifying round by Red Bull Salzburg, resulting in them going into the Play-off round for the UEFA Europa League. In the Europa League, Qarabağ reached the Group Stages for the first time, where they finished third, behind Internazionale and Dnipro Dnipropetrovsk, and ahead of Saint-Étienne.

Squad
 (captain)Out on loan

Transfers
Summer

In:

Out:

Winter

In:

Out:

Friendlies

Competitions
Azerbaijan Supercup

Azerbaijan Premier League

Results summary

Results

League table

Azerbaijan Cup

Final

 UEFA Champions League 

Qualifying phase

 UEFA Europa League 

Qualifying phase

Group stage

Squad statistics

Appearances and goals

|-
|colspan="14"|Players who appeared for Qarabağ but left during the season:''

|}

Goal scorers

Disciplinary record

Notes
Qarabağ have played their home games at the Tofiq Bahramov Stadium since 1993 due to the ongoing situation in Quzanlı.
Dnipro Dnipropetrovsk will play their home matches at Olympic Stadium, Kyiv instead of their regular stadium, Dnipro-Arena, Dnipropetrovsk, due to the pro-Russian unrest in Ukraine.
Araz-Naxçıvan were excluded from the Azerbaijan Premier League on 17 November 2014, with all their results being annulled.

References

Qarabag
Qarabag
Qarabag
Qarabağ FK seasons